Elk Creek is a  tributary of Lake Erie in Erie County, Pennsylvania in the United States. Elk Creek is stocked with brown trout and steelhead by the Pennsylvania Fish and Boat Commission.

Course
Elk Creek has its origins in Fairview Township, McKean Township, and part of Summit Township.  The creek flows northwest through Erie County and enters Lake Erie just west of Lake City in Girard Township.

Little Elk Creek joins Elk Creek in Girard Township and has its origins south in Elk Creek and Franklin Townships.

Elk Creek Access is a local park which can be reached off Pennsylvania Route 5.

See also
 List of rivers of Pennsylvania

References

Rivers of Pennsylvania
Tributaries of Lake Erie
Rivers of Erie County, Pennsylvania